"The Children's Story" is a 4,300-word dystopian fiction novelette by James Clavell. It first appeared in Ladies' Home Journal (October 1963 issue) and was printed in book form in 1981. It was adapted by Clavell himself into a thirty-minute short film for television which aired on Mobil Showcase.

Plot summary
The story takes place in an unnamed school classroom in the United States, in the aftermath of a war between the US and an unnamed country. It is implied that America has been defeated and occupied. The story opens with the previous teacher leaving the classroom, having been removed from her position and replaced with an agent of the foreign power. The new teacher has been trained in propaganda techniques and is responsible for re-educating the children to be supportive of their occupiers. 

During the course of the story, the children are persuaded to abandon their religion and national loyalty. Framing the story is the fact that, while the children have ritually recited a "Pledge of Allegiance" every morning, none know what it actually means. Addressed broadly, lacking the meaning of any word can lead anyone – child or adult – to the malleable state in which we see the children as the story draws to a close. The teacher is relentlessly positive about the change, offering the children candy, songs and praise. When asked if the war was won or lost, she responds only that "we won", implying that everyone would benefit from the conquest.

Only one student is initially hostile to the new teacher, a child named Johnny, whose father had been arrested and placed in a re-education camp. At first, he defends his father, but when he is rewarded by the teacher with a position of authority in the class, he quickly accepts the new regime and commits himself to not accepting "wrong thoughts". The story takes place over a twenty-five-minute span.

Background
The story touches on concepts such as freedom, religion and patriotism.

Yukio Aoshima, who translated this novel into Japanese, suggests it follows on to La Dernière Classe (The Last Class) in Contes du Lundi (1873) by Alphonse Daudet. In a bare 1500 words this talks of the imminent changes in French Alsace as the Germans take over.

Clavell wrote this story after a talk with his six-year-old daughter, who had just returned home from school. His daughter, Michaela, was explaining how she had learned the Pledge of Allegiance and he was struck by the thought that, though she had memorized the pledge, she had no idea what many of the words meant.

Clavell finishes by writing:

Television adaptation
The short story was adapted in 1982 as an installment in the anthology TV series Mobil Showcase. Clavell's daughter (the above-referenced Michaela, known professionally as Michaela Ross during her brief acting career) played a seemingly pleasant young teacher sent to indoctrinate a classroom of American children. She replaces an old teacher (Mildred Dunnock in her penultimate performance), who disappears after the students witness her crying.

References

External links

The Children's Story at the Internet Archive

1964 American novels
1964 science fiction novels
1981 American novels
1981 science fiction novels
1982 films
Works by James Clavell
Dystopian novels
American novellas
Ladies' Home Journal
Reader's Digest
Novels set in schools
Novels set in the United States
Dell Publishing books
American novels adapted into television shows